Zoran Kosanović (January 16, 1956 – February 4, 1998) was a Serbian Canadian table tennis player.

Career

Career in Yugoslavia
Kosanović represented Yugoslavia in all five world championships from 1973 to 1981 (in 1975, he won silver medal at the World Championship). In 1976, he was European Champion in Prague. With his doubles partner Milivoj Karakašević, he reached the European Championship semifinal in 1978.

In the Balkan Championships, he won 11 titles. From 1975 to 1979, he was the Yugoslav champion five times. His highest ranking in the ITTF World Ranking was 7th place.

Career in Canada
In September 1979, Kosanović moved to Toronto. In 1981, he won the North American Championship and in 1982 the US Open. At the 1983 World Championship in Tokyo, he represented Canada.

Death and legacy
On February 4, 1998, Kosanović collapsed while taking part in a recreational soccer match at The Hangar sports complex and died of a heart attack. He is interred in Toronto's York Cemetery.

In March 1998, an annual soccer tournament held in Downsview Park was initiated by the Serbian White Eagles FC.

Personal
Kosanović married Darinka "Doreen" (née Jovanov) in 1979 and had two children: a son Sasha and daughter Tanya.

References

External links

 

1956 births
1998 deaths
Sportspeople from Belgrade
Sportspeople from Toronto
Serbian male table tennis players
Canadian male table tennis players
Yugoslav table tennis players
Canadian people of Serbian descent
Sport deaths in Canada
Mediterranean Games medalists in table tennis
Mediterranean Games gold medalists for Yugoslavia
Mediterranean Games bronze medalists for Yugoslavia
Competitors at the 1979 Mediterranean Games
Yugoslav emigrants to Canada
Burials at York Cemetery, Toronto